Kajetan Kryszkiewicz (28 July 1908 – 2 October 1982) was a Polish football player, who represented Warta Poznań and also capped twice for the national team of Poland without scoring any goals. He began his career in Posnania Poznań, later moving to Warta Poznań, a powerhouse of Polish football in the 1930s. In 1932, he was the top scorer of the Ekstraklasa, with 16 goals.

Kryszkiewicz continued playing for Warta until 1939.

References

1908 births
1982 deaths
Polish footballers
Poland international footballers
Warta Poznań players
Ekstraklasa players
Footballers from Poznań
Association football forwards